Anna Robeson Brown Burr (May 26, 1873 – September 10, 1941) was an American writer of novels, poetry, stories, essays, and biographies. Her The Autobiography: A Critical and Comparative Study (1909), was the first book on the subject.

Early life
Anna Robeson Brown was born in 1873, in Philadelphia, Pennsylvania, the daughter of Henry Armitt Brown and Josephine Lea Baker Brown Leaming. Her father was a lawyer, writer, and orator, who died when Anna was a small child. Charles Brockden Brown was her great-granduncle.

Career
Her novels include: Alain of Halfdene (1895); The Black Lamb (1896); A Cosmopolitan Comedy (1899); The House of Pan: A Romance (1899); The Immortal Garland (1900); The Millionaire's Son (1903); Truth and a Woman (1903); The Wine Press (1905); The Jessop Bequest (1907); The House on Charles Street (1921); The Wrong Move: A Romance (1923); The Great House in the Park (1924); Palludia (1928);  Wind in the East (1933); and The Golden Quicksand: A Novel of Santa Fé (1936). 

She also wrote non-fiction books, among them, The Autobiography: A Critical and Comparative Study (1909), "the first book on the subject"; Religious Confessions and Confessants (1914); The Portrait of a Banker: James Stillman, 1850-1918 (1927); and Weir Mitchell: His Life and Letters (1929). 

Brown also wrote for periodicals including Ladies' Home Journal, Godey's Magazine, Lippincott's Magazine, and St. Nicholas Magazine.

Personal life
Anna Robeson Brown married lawyer Charles Henry Burr Jr. in 1899. They had two daughters, the elder being archaeologist Dorothy Burr Thompson. During World War I, Anna moved herself and her daughters to London to be closer to Charles who was doing work there. Charles Henry Burr Jr. died in 1925. Anna Robeson Brown Burr died in 1941, aged 68 years, from pneumonia.  She is interred at West Laurel Hill Cemetery in Bala Cynwyd, Pennsylvania.

References

1873 births
1941 deaths
American women writers
Burials at West Laurel Hill Cemetery
Writers from Philadelphia